This article is a list of records in the A1 Grand Prix World Cup of Motorsport, since the inaugural 2005–06 A1 Grand Prix season, and is accurate up to and including the 2008–09 A1 Grand Prix season.

A1 Grand Prix team records

Championships

Wins

 Most wins in a season : 13 (7 Sprints, 6 Mains)  France in 2005–06.

Pole positions

 Most pole positions in a season : 6  Switzerland in 2007–08, and  Ireland in 2008–09.

Fastest laps

 Most fastest laps in a season : 9  France in 2005–06.

Points

Teams yet to score points
 Both teams have yet to reappear since 2005–06.

Other

Most drivers used during same weekend
  France used three different drivers at the same 2007–08 South Africa weekend: Loïc Duval as race driver; Jonathan Cochet as practice driver; and Nicolas Prost as rookie driver. ( Greece employed three different drivers at the Netherlands weekend in 2006–07, but only two took part).

Consecutive starts without points
  Lebanon participated in 65 races without winning points beginning with the inaugural 2005–06 Great Britain Sprint Race. The team finally scored its first-ever points finish in the feature race at Zandvoort, in its 33rd race weekend.

Driver records

Caps

Youngest capped drivers

Oldest capped drivers

Wins

Youngest :  Christian Vietoris, 18y 9m 19d, Feature Race, 2007–08

Pole positions

Youngest :  Robert Wickens, 18y 11m 11d, Sprint Race, 2007–08 .

Fastest laps

Youngest :  Sébastien Buemi, 18y 5m 29d, Feature Race, 2006–07

Other

Consecutive starts
 Alex Yoong ran consecutively 45 starts (24 races) from Feature Race, 2005–06  to Feature Race, 2007–08 .

Different teams
 Enrico Toccacelo ran for two different teams, A1 Team Italy and A1 Team Pakistan. He raced the Pakistani car after Adam Langley-Khan was injured during practice sessions of 2005–06, South Africa.
 Daniel Morad drove as Rookie driver for Canada in 2007–08 and as Main driver for Lebanon in 2008–09. His Canadian-Lebanese heritage allowed him to switch nationalities, as he had not yet made his race debut.

Other

Events by Country

Tracks with most race weekends

Fuel
A1 Grand Prix is the first racing series to use a 30% biofuel mix. An ethanol based product, Hiperflo E30, has been used since 2007–08, New Zealand.

References

External links 
All-time Statistics results.a1gp.com

Records